John Amery (14 March 1912 – 19 December 1945) was a British fascist and Nazi collaborator during World War II. He was the originator of the British Free Corps, a volunteer Waffen-SS unit composed of former British and Dominion prisoners-of-war.

Amery conducted recruitment efforts, and made propaganda broadcasts for Germany. He later gave direct support to Benito Mussolini. He was prosecuted by the British authorities and pleaded guilty to eight counts of high treason, for which he was sentenced to death, seven months after the war in Europe ended.

Early life
Born in Chelsea, London, John Amery was the elder of two children of British statesman Leo Amery (1873–1955), a member of parliament and later Conservative government minister, whose mother was a Hungarian Jew who had converted to Protestantism. His younger brother, Julian (1919–1996), also became an MP and served in a Conservative government.

Amery was a difficult child who ran through a succession of private tutors. Like his father, he was sent to Harrow, but left after only a year, being described by his housemaster as "without doubt, the most difficult boy I have ever tried to manage." Living in his father's shadow, he strove to make his own way by embarking on a career in film production. Over a period, he set up a number of independent companies, all of which failed; these endeavours rapidly led to bankruptcy.

At the age of 21, Amery married Una Wing, a former prostitute, but was never able to earn enough to keep her for himself. He was constantly appealing to his father for money. A staunch anti-Communist, he came to embrace the National Socialist doctrines of Germany on the grounds that they were the only alternative to Bolshevism. He left Britain permanently to live in France after being declared bankrupt in 1936. In Paris, he met the French fascist leader Jacques Doriot, with whom he travelled to Austria, Italy, and Germany to witness the effects of fascism in those countries.

Amery told his family he had joined Francisco Franco's Nationalists during the Spanish Civil War in 1936 and was awarded a medal of honour while serving as an intelligence officer with Italian volunteer forces (Corpo Truppe Volontarie). He actually worked for Franco as a liaison with French Cagoulard groups and gun-runner. After the Spanish war, Amery settled in France.

Second World War

Occupied France
Amery remained in France following the German invasion in June 1940. On 22 June, the Second Armistice at Compiègne was signed between France and Germany. Amery resided in the territory belonging to the collaborationist Vichy government led by Marshal Philippe Pétain. However, his personality soon antagonised the Vichy Regime so he made several attempts to leave but was not allowed. The head of the German Armistice Commission offered Amery a chance to live in Germany to work in the political arena but he was unable to get Amery out of occupied France.

In September 1942, Hauptmann Werner Plack gained Amery the French travel permit he needed, and in October Plack and Amery travelled to Berlin to speak to the German English Committee. It was at this time that Amery suggested that the Germans consider forming a British anti-Bolshevik legion. Adolf Hitler was impressed by Amery and allowed him to remain in Germany as a guest. During this period, Amery made a series of pro-German propaganda radio broadcasts, attempting to appeal to the British people to join the war on communism.

British Free Corps
The idea of a British force to fight the communists languished until Amery encountered Jacques Doriot during a visit to France in January 1943. Doriot was part of the LVF (Légion des Volontaires Français), a French volunteer force fighting alongside the Germans on the eastern front.

Amery rekindled his idea of a British unit and aimed to recruit 50 to 100 men for propaganda purposes and to establish a core of men with which to attract additional members from British prisoners of war. He also suggested that such a unit could provide more recruits for the other military units made up of foreign nationals.

Amery's first recruiting drive for what was initially to be called the British Legion of St George took him to the Saint-Denis POW camp outside Paris. Amery addressed between 40 and 50 inmates from British Commonwealth countries and handed out recruiting material. This first effort at recruitment was a complete failure, but he persisted.

Amery's drive for recruits found two men, of whom only one, Kenneth Berry, joined what was later called the BFC. Amery's link to the unit ended in October 1943, when the Waffen SS decided his services were no longer needed, and it was officially renamed the British Free Corps.

Arrest
Amery continued to broadcast and write propaganda in Berlin until late 1944 when he travelled to Northern Italy to lend support to Italian dictator Benito Mussolini's Salò Republic. On 25 April 1945, Amery was captured along with his French mistress Michelle Thomas by Italian partisans from the Garibaldi Brigade near Como. Amery and Thomas were initially to be executed, but both of them were eventually sent to Milan, where they were handed over to Allied authorities. Amery was wearing the uniform of the "Muti Legion", a fascist paramilitary organisation. The British army officer who took him into custody was Captain Alan Whicker, later known as a broadcaster.

Amery was returned to the United Kingdom by air. With him on the flight was William Joyce, the propaganda broadcaster widely known as "Lord Haw-Haw". They were escorted by three armed soldiers and Leonard Burt, a senior police officer seconded to the British Army Intelligence Corps.

Trial and execution
Amery was tried for treason in London. In a preliminary hearing, he argued that he had never attacked Britain and was an anti-Communist, not a Nazi. At the same time, his brother Julian attempted to show that John had become a Spanish citizen, and therefore would legally be incapable of committing treason against the United Kingdom.

His counsel, Gerald Osborne Slade KC, meanwhile, tried to show that the accused was mentally ill. Amery's sanity was questioned by his own father, Leo, but all efforts to have the court consider his mental state were unsuccessful. Further attempts at a defence were suddenly abandoned on the first day of his trial, 28 November 1945, when to general astonishment, Amery pleaded guilty to eight charges of treason, and was sentenced to death. The trial lasted just eight minutes.

Before accepting Amery's guilty plea, the judge, Mr Justice Humphreys, made certain that Amery realised the only permissible penalty would be death by hanging. After satisfying himself that Amery fully understood the consequences of pleading guilty, the judge announced this verdict:

Amery was hanged in Wandsworth Prison on 19 December 1945 by executioner Albert Pierrepoint, who in his autobiography described Amery as "the bravest person I'd ever hanged", and buried in the prison cemetery. Amery actually quipped as he was led to the scaffold, "I've always wanted to meet you, Mr Pierrepoint, though not of course under these circumstances!" In 1996, Julian Amery had his brother's remains exhumed and cremated, scattering his ashes in France.

An epitaph by his father appears in The Empire at Bay. The Leo Amery Diaries. 1929–1945:

Cultural references
Ronald Harwood's play An English Tragedy, charting the weeks leading up to Amery's execution following his arrest in Italy and trial in London, adapted for radio by Bert Coules, was broadcast by BBC Radio 4 on 8 May 2010 and 13 April 2012. The cast included Geoffrey Streatfeild as Amery and Sir Derek Jacobi as Leo Amery.

See also
Friesack Camp
John Codd
Lord Haw-Haw
Sir Oswald Mosley

References

Bibliography

Further reading 
John Amery, L'Angleterre et l'Europe [England and Europe], Documents et Témoignages: collection d'essais politiques 1, (Paris, 1943) 48 p.
Casciani, Dominic, How Britain made its executioners, BBC News online 1 June 2006 [accessed 22 July 2007]
Faber, David, Speaking for England: Leo, Julian and John Amery, the tragedy of a political family (London; New York : Free Press, 2005) 
Weale, Adrian, Patriot traitors : Roger Casement, John Amery and the real meaning of treason (London : Viking, 2001) 
West, Rebecca, The meaning of treason, (London : Phoenix, new edn. 2000) 
Fielding, Steve, Pierrepoint: Family of Executioners (London: John Blake Publishing, paperback, 2008)

External links
 Interview with John Amery in Norway in 1944
 John Amery biographical sketch, psychiatric report, his radio broadcast, leaflet, and The Times article.
 Info related to his trial
 British Volunteers in the German Wehrmacht in WWII by Jason Pipes
 Papers held in the National Archives – KV 2/78 1939 Apr 06-1944 Aug 18,
 KV 2/79 1944 Aug 22-1945 Mar 06,
 KV 2/80 1945 Mar 07-1945 May 25, 
 KV 2/81 1945 May 26-1945 Dec 13,
 KV 2/82 1945 Dec 14-1946 Jan 04
 Central Criminal Court Depositions – CRIM 1/1717
 

1912 births
1945 deaths
John
English broadcasters for Nazi Germany
People educated at West Downs School
People educated at Harrow School
English fascists
Executed people from London
British propagandists
People from Chelsea, London
Executed British collaborators with Nazi Germany
People executed by the United Kingdom by hanging
British anti-communists
English people of Hungarian-Jewish descent
20th-century executions by England and Wales